Chamaz Tappeh (also Romanized as Chamāz Tappeh) is a village in Gahrbaran-e Shomali Rural District, Gahrbaran District, Miandorud County, Mazandaran Province, Iran. At the 2006 census, its population was 561, in 160 families.

References 

Populated places in Miandorud County